Trauma, Violence, & Abuse is a peer-reviewed academic journal that covers research on trauma, abuse, and violence. The journal's editor-in-chief is Jon R. Conte (University of Washington). It was established in 2000 and is currently published by SAGE Publications.

Abstracting and indexing 
Trauma, Violence, & Abuse is abstracted and indexed in MEDLINE/PubMed, Scopus, and the Social Sciences Citation Index. According to the Journal Citation Reports, its 2019 impact factor is 6.325, ranking it 1st out of 44 journals in the category "Social Work", 1st out of 47 journals in the category "Family Studies", and 2nd out of 69 journals in the category "Criminology & Penology".

See also
 Psychological trauma
 Trauma (medicine)

References

External links 
 

SAGE Publishing academic journals
English-language journals
Quarterly journals
Publications established in 2000
Sociology journals
Violence journals